Guadalcázar is a town located in the province of Córdoba, southern Spain.

References

External links
Guadalcázar - Sistema de Información Multiterritorial de Andalucía

Municipalities in the Province of Córdoba (Spain)